The SS Vienna was built in 1873 during the era when steamers were built with sail rigging.  She had a 19 year career marked with maritime incidents including sinking when she was just 3 years old.  She sank for her final time in fair weather in Whitefish Bay in Lake Superior after she received a mortal blow when she was inexplicably rammed by the steamer Nipigon.  Although there were no deaths when the Vienna sank for the last time, more than 100 years later her wreck claimed the lives of 4 scuba divers, the most of all the wrecks in the Whitefish Point Underwater Preserve that now protects her as part of an underwater museum.  Her wreck was stripped of artifacts that resulted in the Michigan Department of Natural Resources seizing her artifacts in a raid on the Great Lakes Shipwreck Museum in 1992.  Her artifacts are now on display in this museum as loan from the State of Michigan.

Career 
Quayle & Martin built the wooden steamer Vienna with an octagonal pilot house and sail rigging in 1873 for the Cleveland Transportation Company during the era when insurance companies still required ships to carry sails to maintain liability coverage.
   
Vienna had a series of maritime incidents during her 19 year career. In August 1876, she  ran ashore at Presque Isle in Lake Huron and was able to get off. Her luck did not hold in October 1876 when she sank in Lake Superior with a cargo of grain when she was just 3 years old. She was rebuilt in 1875 – 1876 as a double-decker with 3 masts and increased tonnage. In September 1883 she sustained considerable damage when the Willow Street bridge swung into her in Cleveland, Ohio. In 1889, she was sold to Orient Transportation Company of Rockport, Ohio. In 1890, her rigging was changed to 2 masts. She sank for a second and final time in 1892.

Final voyage

In fair weather at 12:25 am on 17 September 1892, the steamer Nipigon was light and upbound in Whitefish Bay in Lake Superior towing the schooners Melbourne and Delaware. Vienna under Captain J.W. Nicholson was downbound from Marquette, Michigan and towing the schooner Mattie C. Bell. Both were heavy with a cargo of iron ore. Both vessels immediately dropped their consorts. No one could explain why the Nipigon failed to obey her helm. Vienna was valued at $46,000 but she was only partly insured. Vienna's crew and papers were transferred to the lumber hooker Nipigon. Nipigon's stem and forefoot were badly crushed but she was not leaking much and she was able to proceed on her way. A tug towed Bell to Sault Ste. Marie, Michigan.

Wreck artifacts
The wreck of Vienna was discovered in 1975 by the United States Fisheries R.V. Kohvo research vessel while setting fish sampling nets.  She was then extensively explored by divers Kent Bellrichard of Milwaukee, Wisconsin and Tom Farnquist, Director of the Great Lakes Shipwreck Historical Society (GLSHS) and the Great Lakes Shipwreck Museum.  Shipwreck historian Gerred wrote of Bellrichard and Farnquist's dives to Vienna: They had made many trips to the wreck and brought up some interesting artifacts.  Among them were a hand carved eagle atop the pilot house, the ship's wheel, wooden blocks, portholes, a telegraph bell, whistle pull, dishes, crocks, and a large grindstone.  Farnquist, who is an expert on making lamps, book ends, and tables from wreck material, refinished the wheel.  He mounted it against blue velvet with a polished frame of wreck wood.  It is displayed at the Lake Superior College and will be donated to their future marine museum.  The eagle also was refinished and donated to the museum ship, Valley Camp.
Michigan's Antiquities Act of 1980 prohibited the removal of artifacts from shipwrecks on the Great Lakes bottomlands. The Michigan Department of Natural Resources and Environment (DNRE) 1992 raid on the GLSHS offices and Great Lakes Shipwreck Museum included seizure of artifacts that were illegally removed from the Vienna. 
Artifacts from Vienna's wreck are on display in the Great Lakes Shipwreck Museum as a loan from the State of Michigan by a 1993 settlement agreement with the GLSHS following the DNRE raid on the museum in 1992. Vienna's wreck in now protected by the Whitefish Point Underwater Preserve as part of an underwater museum.

Wreck diving

She is known as a "blow-off" wreck dive because she lies closer to shore and extended-range divers go to this wreck during high winds and rough seas or when they have limited time. Her wreck is moored to protect her remains and enhance the safety of divers. However, the greater accessibility of Vienna  belies her ability to ensnare even technically skilled, experienced scuba divers. The 4 diving fatalities on her wreck are the most of all the wrecks in the Whitefish Point Underwater Preserve. Her remains are intact and upright and divers especially enjoy exploring her intact bow cabins.
In 1994, 102 years after Vienna sank, an experienced male diver who was a member of the Chippewa County Sheriff's Department died while diving her wreck.    In 1995, an experienced male diver died of massive emboli after deeply penetrating the wreck, likely running out of air, and attempting an uncontrolled ascent without staged decompression. In 1996, an inexperienced female diver's body was recovered from the wreck of the Vienna in  feet of water when her companion diver who was her fiancé was unable to rescue her.  A fourth diving fatality occurred at the wreck of Vienna in 1998 but details of the accident are not available.

References

External links
Resource for Great Lakes shipwrecks
Video of the Vienna

1873 ships
Ships built in Cleveland
Steamships of the United States
Merchant ships of the United States
Maritime incidents in 1892
Ships sunk in collisions
Shipwrecks of Lake Superior
Great Lakes freighters
Wreck diving sites